1897 was the eighth season of County Championship cricket in England. Lancashire won the championship for the first time, thanks mainly to only three losses in twenty-six matches. Surrey won more games, and beat Lancashire twice, but one more loss than Lancashire meant that they would have to be content with second place. They could have taken the championship if they had beaten Sussex in the last game at Hove but, after gaining a five-run lead on first innings, Surrey let Billy Murdoch, C. B. Fry and George Bean make half-centuries, and rain spoiled their chances of winning on the final day. At the bottom of the table, Derbyshire suffered a run of 16 matches without victory to finish last in the table and, with the end of the 1896 season having yielded three matches without a win, Derbyshire's streak ran to 19 matches without a win.

Honours
County Championship – Lancashire
Minor Counties Championship – Worcestershire
Wisden – Frederick Bull, Willis Cuttell, Frank Druce, Gilbert Jessop, Jack Mason

County Championship

Final table 

 1 Games completed

Points system:

 1 for a win
 0 for a draw, a tie or an abandoned match
 -1 for a loss

Most runs in the County Championship

Most wickets in the County Championship

Overall first-class statistics

Leading batsmen

Leading bowlers

References

Annual reviews
 James Lillywhite's Cricketers' Annual (Red Lilly), Lillywhite, 1898
 Wisden Cricketers' Almanack 1898

External links
 Cricket in England in 1897

1897 in English cricket
1897